Government House, located in Road Town, Tortola, is the official residence of the governor of the British Virgin Islands.

The original structure, dating back to 1899, was destroyed by a hurricane in 1924. The present structure was built on the same site in 1925-26 and was the home of commissioners, presidents, administrators and governors until 1999, when it was deemed unsuitable. The Island Sun published an editorial against the demolition of the historic building and members of the public expressed their disagreement with the official decision. In 2003, a new Government House was built on adjacent land while the old structure has been transformed into a museum.

In November 2003, Governor Thomas Macan moved into the new residence located at Tortola. The project included the construction of the new Government House and a reception hall, as well as the restoration of the old Government House, which is now a museum. The structure was built by Meridian Construction and designed by OBM and FCO Estates.

See also
Governor of the British Virgin Islands
Government Houses of the British Empire

External links
Old Government House Museum, Tortola, British Virgin Islands

Official residences
Government Houses of the British Empire and Commonwealth
Buildings and structures in Road Town